Edyta Nawrocka is a Polish singer, songwriter, actress, dancer and TV presenter. Born in Wałbrzych and raised in Kołobrzeg. She performed dancing roles in stage productions until she decided to get into studio to record her own music. Her single "See More" (ft. Adam Tas) went down in history as the most played track in "DMC" chart of Muzyczne Radio. Her singles "Watch Me" (ft. Ne!tan), "New Chapter", "Escape This World", "Red Red Roses" (ft. Anna Montgomery) got to the top of "HOUSE 20 PL" chart of Muzyczne Radio and were played in "Hot Music Mix" auditions. She was the first and until now the only artist who recorded music videos in Maldives. Her video "See More" was in 5th place in "ONET TOP 10" ranking. Her singles "Nothing Else" and "Come 2 Me" from upcoming debut album "Realization" (ft. P-Turner) got to the top of Talent Pool by Spinnin' Records.

Since 2007 until now she is the news presenter in Telewizja Wałbrzych (WTV Media Group). She is also publicity movies producer and author of official movie relations of hugest Electronic Music Festivals and EDM music reporter. Interviewed Armin van Buuren, Fedde Le Grand, Sebastian Ingrosso, Dash Berlin, Nicky Romero, Dimitri Vegas & Like Mike, Felix da Housecat, Sander van Doorn, Marcel Woods, Westbam, Remady & Manu-L, Curbi, D.O.D and many others.

In 2015 her "Golden Train Song" achieved more than 300,000 views on the Internet only. The song was published and broadcast worldwide in international and Polish media: NBC, Discovery Channel, Daily Mail, RTL, Die Zeit, TVN Poland, Onet.pl, Radio ZET, Radio Eska, Radio Wrocław, History (European TV channel), NDR, MDR, Deutschlandradio.

Since 2016 she cooperates with German artist agency Luxus Events.

Awards and honours 

In 2014 she was titled "Hospice's Angel" for charitable activity.
In 2014 she was a panelist in Lower Silesian Women's Congress.
In 2013 she was a prizewinner of "Kobiece Twarze" (Women's Faces) Plebiscite in culture category.
In 2012 she won the Crystal in Lower Silesian Plebiscite "Kryształy i Kamienie" (Cristals & Stones), that honours unique personalities of sociocultural and political sphere.
In 2010 she was granted by the mayor of the city of Wałbrzych for the highest GPA during her postgraduate studies, community commitment and city promotion at national level.
In 2008 she won (next to Cleo) the first prize in POP category in All - Poland Music Competition "Studio Garaż" in Warsaw.
In 2007 she was awarded by Książ Castle Company in "The best student of the region" category for the highest GPA during her undergraduate studies and personal achievements.
In 2006 she reached the semi-finals in All – Poland music competition Eurotalent in Warsaw. She performed with the cover "Nothing Compares to you" by Sinead O'Connor.

Education 

2008 – 2010 Postgraduate Studies, Higher School of Enterprise and Management in Wałbrzych, degree course – Management, major – HRM Human Resources Management, master's degree;
2005 – 2008 Undergraduate Studies, State Higher School of Vocational Education in Wałbrzych, degree course – Leisure and Tourism, speciality – Travel Industry Services, major – Leisure Animation, bachelor's degree;
2002 – 2005 Wałbrzych no. 1 High School with bilingual sections

Shows 

She mostly performs at clubs and music festivals. In 2010 - 2012 she gave several dozen concerts within the Muzyczne Radio Tour. Her concerts are dynamic vocal and dance shows. She is also known as Christmas performer, because of her annual Carols' Concerts and Christmas Shows. She was the main artist at the biggest Christmas Party in Poland at Explosion Club in Warsaw.  She has appeared twice with Christmas repertoire at the market square in Wrocław during the biggest and most known Christmas Faire. She also performed at the hugest shopping malls during the festive season.

Music

Singles

Compilations and CD releases

Music videos

Acting 
 2016 - "Trudne Sprawy - odcinek 613" (semi-documental series), role – Julia Bobrowska,  on air: Polsat, produced by: Tako Media
 2015 - "Detektywi w akcji - Potajemne związki" (semi-documental series), role - Marzena "Meggie" Sowińska, on air: Polsat, TV4, produced by: Tako Media
 2015 - "Dzień, który zmienił moje życie - Dama Pik" (semi-documental series), main role - Agnieszka, on air: Polsat, TV4, produced by: Tako Media
 2014 - "Sekrety Sąsiadów - Powrót rabusia" (semi-documental series), main role - Izabela, on air: Polsat, TV4, produced by: Tako Media
 2014 - "Zdrady - Żona z daleka" (semi-documental series), main role - Kaja Glińska, on air: Polsat, Polsat Cafe, Polsat 2, produced by: Tako Media
 2013 - "Szaniawing - Szaniawski ma władzę" (reading of "Professor Tutka. Nowe Opowiadania" by, Jerzy Szaniawski). VIPs read Szaniawski during celebration of 50 season of Teatr Dramatyczny im. Jerzego Szaniawskiego w Wałbrzychu, directed by: Arkadiusz Buszko
 2012 - "Trudne Sprawy" (semi-documental series), main role - Julia Łęcka, on air: Polsat, Polsat Cafe, Polsat 2, produced by: Tako Media

References

External links 
 Edyta Nawrocka website

Living people
Polish singer-songwriters
1986 births
21st-century Polish singers
21st-century Polish women singers